Oldbury Camp (also known as Oldbury hill fort) is the largest Iron Age hill fort in south-eastern England. It was built in the 1st century BC by Celtic British tribes on a hilltop west of Ightham, Kent, in a strategic location overlooking routes through the Kentish Weald. Wooden gates barred the entrances. Archaeological excavations carried out in the 1930s and 1980s found that the hill fort's interior had probably not been permanently occupied. It had been abandoned around 50 BC and the north-east gate had been burned down, possibly due to a Roman invasion. The wooded southern part of Oldbury Camp is now owned and managed by the National Trust and is open to the public.

Description

Oldbury Camp is located near the village of Ightham, Kent. It is situated on the summit of Oldbury Hill, a partly wooded plateau on a north-south alignment on the Greensand Ridge. It is bounded by very steep natural cliffs on the eastern side, with commanding views over one of the main routes through the Weald.

At least two entrances were constructed, on the north-east and southern ends of the hill fort. A spring is located near the centre of the site and would have ensured a constant supply of fresh water for the hill fort's defenders. Overhangs and hollows in the rocks on the eastern side of the hill fort were occupied as long ago as the Middle Palaeolithic period and are now known as the Oldbury rock shelters.

History

The hill fort was constructed during the first century BC, likely in a rapidly executed project carried out on a massive scale. The eastern side above the cliffs was probably defended only by a wooden pallisade, as the cliffs there made it unnecessary to continue the bank and ditch along the escarpment.

The defences were subsequently strengthened by adding further material to the bank to create a glacis. The ditch was widened to give it a wide, flat bottom of the Fécamp type, named after a Gaulish oppidum near the eponymous town in Normandy. A stone revetment was constructed at the north-east entrance, probably with a wooden breastwork, above and beside a heavy wooden gate protected by a defensive outwork. The gate was destroyed by burning and a large quantity of sling stones was found nearby. Another gate was constructed at the south entrance but has been badly damaged by the construction of a modern road. It is not clear whether buildings existed in the hill fort's interior, although large quantities of pottery have been discovered there. Oldbury Camp was probably used only as a temporary shelter or a place of refuge, rather than as the site of a permanent settlement.

The reasons for the construction and eventual abandonment of Oldbury Camp are unclear, but it may have been built by a local tribe seeking to resist the invasion at the time of the Belgae, a tribal confederation from northern Gaul. They were evidently unsuccessful as the Belgae conquered and settled in Kent. The fort was abandoned around the time of Caesar's invasions of Britain in 55 and 54 BC and may have been attacked by the Romans, if the burned northern gate indicates an assault rather than slighting by retreating defenders. Parts of the site appear to have been reused for quarrying during the Roman period.

Excavations

Oldbury Camp has been excavated archaeologically twice: once in 1938 by John Bryan Ward-Perkins and again in 1983–84. While the 1938 excavations suggested that the hill fort had been built in two phases about half a century apart, this theory was abandoned as a result of the 1983–84 excavations determining that it was instead constructed as a single rapidly executed project. It had previously been thought that modifications to the defences were the result of the Belgae refortifying it against the Roman invasion but this now seems unlikely.

Access

The southern part of Oldbury Hill and Styants Wood immediately to the west is now in the ownership of the National Trust, which acquired it in 1945, and is open to the public. It is managed by Kent County Council. The northern part is privately owned farmland, but is covenanted to protect it.

References

External links
 Oldbury Hill – National Trust

Hill forts in Kent
Archaeological sites in Kent
Tonbridge and Malling
National Trust properties in Kent
1st century BC in Great Britain
Iron Age England